David Hand may refer to:

 David Hand (bishop) (1918–2006), first Anglican Archbishop of Papua New Guinea
 David Hand (statistician) (born 1950), British statistician
 David Hand (animator) (1900–1986), animator and animation filmmaker